The Examined Life is a 2013 collection of essays by the practising psychoanalyst Stephen Grosz, which is an attempt to "distil over 50,000 hours of conversation into pure psychological insight, without the jargon." The book was serialised as Book of the Week on BBC Radio 4 in January 2012, and spent 10 weeks on the Sunday Times non-fiction bestseller list. It has been translated into  Dutch, Italian, German, Portuguese and Korean, and will be published in a further 14 languages including Spanish, Chinese and Hebrew. In The New York Times, Michiko Kakutani praised the book as "an insightful and beautifully written… a series of slim, piercing chapters that read like a combination of Chekhov and Oliver Sacks".

References

2013 non-fiction books
Chatto & Windus books
English-language books
Essay collections